Changer les choses (Change the Things) is the official debut album by the France-born R&B singer Nâdiya. The album was only released in France on November 5, 2001. It spawned the French hit singles "Chaque fois" and "J'ai confiance en toi". Both singles charted in the French Singles Chart, but the album failed in France, not charting in the top 200 at all.

Track listing
"Chaque fois" - 3:46
"J'te dis Bye Bye" - 3:24
"J'ai confiance en toi" - 3:56
"Qui pour rait m'aimer" - 3:33
"Rien que pour toi" - 2:52
"Simon" - 0:18
"Changer les choses" - 3:57
"La personne à qui tu penses" - 3:45
"Là-bas" - 0:14
"Le regard des miens" - 3:42
"Écoute ma prière" - 4:26
"Nos routes se séparent" - 3:41
"Quelques soient les apparences (feat. Eric Daniel)" - 3:37
"T'es en moi" - 4:17
"Ouvre grand ton coeur" - 5:06

Singles

References

Nâdiya albums
2001 debut albums